Chinese Taipei women's national basketball team is a national women's basketball team of Chinese Taipei (previously referred to as Taiwan or Formosa).

Asia Cup record
 1965 – 3rd place
 1968 – 3rd place
 1970 – 3rd place
 1972 – 2nd place
 1974 – 3rd place
 1986 – 3rd place
 1988 – 3rd place
 1990 – 4th place
 1992 – 4th place
 1994 – 4th place
 1995 – 4th place
 1997 – 4th place
 1999 – 3rd place
 2001 – 4th place
 2004 – 4th place
 2005 – 3rd place
 2009 – 4th place
 2011 – 4th place
 2013 – 4th place
 2015 – 4th place
 2015 – 4th place
 2017 – 5th place
 2019 – 6th place
 2021 – 6th place

Current roster
Roster for the 2021 FIBA Women's Asia Cup.

See also
 Chinese Taipei men's national basketball team
 Chinese Taipei women's national under-19 basketball team
 Chinese Taipei women's national under-17 basketball team
 Chinese Taipei women's national 3x3 team

References

External links

FIBA profile

 
national
Women's national basketball teams